National Bank of Fujairah is a full-service corporate bank that offers corporate and commercial banking, treasury and trade finance services, personal banking options, and Shari’a-compliant services.

The bank is rated Baa1/Prime-2 for deposits and A3 for counterparty risk assessment by Moody’s  and BBB+/A-2 by Standard & Poor’s, both with a stable outlook. It is listed on the Abu Dhabi Securities Exchange under the symbol “NBF”.

Business focus 
National Bank of Fujairah provides corporate banking, business banking, personal banking services along with trade finance, treasury, cash management, precious metals and diamonds and Islamic banking support. In 2017, the bank was the first conventional bank to join Nasdaq Dubai’s Islamic Murabaha platform for Islamic financing. The bank also offers advisory services through its independent subsidiary, NBF Capital Limited.

The bank has also launched the ‘NBF Direct’ platform for online and mobile banking for corporate and retail clients.

Branch network 
The bank has branches across the UAE, with head offices in Dubai and Fujairah.

 Abu Dhabi
 Mussafah
 Al Ain
 Al Quoz
 Al Ras
 Bur Dubai
 Jebel Ali
 Sharjah
 Fujairah
 Dibba
 Fujairah Court
 Fujairah Free Zone
 Masafi
 Qidfah
 Tawian
 Dubai South-Electronic Banking Service Unit

Operations 
The bank was established in 1982 and commenced operations in 1984.

Ownership 
The bank's shareholders' profile, as at May 31, 2018, is as follows:

 Department of Industry and Economy - Government of Fujairah - 40.86%
 Easa Saleh Al Gurg LLC - 21.49%
 Investment Corporation of Dubai - 8.74%
 Fujairah Investment Company - 5.10%
 Citizens of the United Arab Emirates - 23.81%

Subsidiaries 
The bank has 3 subsidiaries:

NBF Financial Services FZC 
Established in December 2004, with limited liability status in the Fujairah Free Trade Zone, NBF Financial Services FZC provides the bank with key financial advisory and support services.

NBF Capital Ltd, DIFC 
Registered in the Dubai International Financial Centre (DIFC) as a company limited by shares under DIFC laws and regulations and regulated by the Dubai Financial Services Authority (DFSA).

The Company was established on April 3, 2013 and commenced operations on May 12, 2013. The principal business activities of the Company are arranging credit or deals in investments and advising on financial products or credit.

NBF Markets (Cayman) Ltd 
Registered in the Cayman Islands as an exempted company limited by shares under the Companies Law (revised) of the Cayman Islands and regulated by the Cayman Island Government General Registry.

The Company was established on 31 January 2017 to provide support services to the Bank to enter into foreign exchange and derivative transactions with financial institutions / counterparties under the terms and conditions of International Swaps and Derivatives Association (ISDA).

Board of Directors 

 Sheikh Saleh Bin Mohamed Bin Hamad Al Sharqi, Chairman
 His Excellency Easa Saleh Al Gurg, KCVO, CBE, Deputy Chairman
 Sheikh Hamad Bin Saleh Bin Mohamed Al Sharqi
 Hussain Mirza Al Sayegh
 Dr. Sulaiman Mousa Al Jassim
 Saif Sultan Al Salami
 Mohamed Obaid Bin Majed Al Aleeli
 Abdulla Fareed Al Gurg
 Ahmed Saeed Al Raqbani

Management 

 NBF CONNECT BANK IN UAE
 Adnan Anwar, Deputy Chief Executive Officer
 Balaji Krishnamurthy, Chief Operations Officer
 Stuart Wright, Acting Chief Risk Officer
 Sharif Mohammed Rafei, Senior Executive Officer - Fujairah Region
 Abdulla Aleter, Head of Human Resources
 Colin Dallas, Head of Retail Banking

References 

Banks of the United Arab Emirates
Banks established in 1982
Emirati companies established in 1982